Krishna Nand Tripathi(born 1977) is an Indian National Congress politician from Jharkhand, India. He represented Daltonganj constituency of Jharkhand Legislative Assembly.

Electoral Performances

References

Living people
20th-century Indian politicians
Indian National Congress politicians from Jharkhand
People from Palamu district
Jharkhand MLAs 2009–2014
1977 births